The GER Class D81 was a class of twenty-five 0-6-0 steam locomotives designed by A. J. Hill for the Great Eastern Railway. The all passed to the London and North Eastern Railway at the 1923 grouping and received the classification J20.

History
These locomotives were fitted with  cylinders and  wheels, while the Belpaire firebox-fitted boiler was identical to that fitted to the Class S69 4-6-0s. They were the most powerful 0-6-0 tender locomotive in Britain until the arrival of Oliver Bulleid's Q1 class for the Southern Railway in 1942.

All were still in service at the 1923 grouping, the LNER adding 7000 to the numbers of nearly all the ex-Great Eastern locomotives, including the Class D81 locomotives. Between 1943 and 1956 the class was rebuilt with round-top fireboxes, and reclassified as  J20/1.

At nationalisation in 1948, British Railways added 60000 to their LNER numbers. They all continued in service until 1959, when the first was withdrawn; all were gone by the end of 1962.

References

External links

 – Great Eastern Railway Society
The Hill J20 (GER Class D81) 0-6-0 Locomotives – LNER Encyclopedia

D81
0-6-0 locomotives
Railway locomotives introduced in 1920
Standard gauge steam locomotives of Great Britain
Freight locomotives